The Jerusalem Theatre (The Jerusalem Centre for the Performing Arts) is a centre for the performing arts in Jerusalem. The theatre opened in 1971. The complex consists of the Sherover Theatre, which seats 950, the Henry Crown Symphony Hall (home of the Jerusalem Symphony Orchestra) with 750 seats, the Rebecca Crown Auditorium, with 450 seats, and the Little Theatre with 110 seats. Changing art exhibits are held in the main foyer and other spaces in the building, and a restaurant and bookshop operate on the ground floor.

History
In 1958, the Jerusalem Municipality, headed by Mordechai Ish Shalom, held a design competition for a  municipal theatre on a plot of 11 dunams (2.8 acres), on the southern edge of the Talbiya neighborhood. Architects Michael Nadler, Shulamit Nadler and Shmuel Bixson won first prize. The municipality also received a large donation from the Jewish millionaire Miles Sherover, who made his fortune in Venezuela.

The cornerstone laying took place in October 1964. Despite plans to complete the building within two years, work progressed slowly due to disputes and budgetary problems. Critics claimed that the city had more pressing problems and predicted that the theatre would be a "white elephant." The building was dedicated in October 1971.

American millionaire Lester Crown, who had donated $9 million for a new sports stadium, in the Shuafat area that was never built, was persuaded by Jerusalem mayor Teddy Kollek to change the designation of the donation from sports to arts and culture. The money was used to build the Henry Crown Concert Hall, which seats 750, and the Rebecca Crown Auditorium, which seats 450. The planning and design of the new wing was carried out by the same architectural firm, so that the new wing, named for Crown's parents, was a natural continuation of the original design.

Architecture
The theatre combines sculptural elements of exposed concrete with traditional Jerusalem stone construction. It sits in a large public square that is used for outdoor concerts and other events.

Tenants
 Mrs. World 1999 
 Israel Prize

See also
International Convention Center (Jerusalem)
Music of Israel
Architecture of Israel
Culture of Israel

References

External links
 Jerusalem Theatre website

1971 establishments in Israel
Theatres completed in 1971
Theatres in Jerusalem
Culture of Jerusalem
Buildings and structures in Jerusalem
Tourist attractions in Jerusalem
Performing arts centres
Talbiya